Stellaria recurvata is a species of plant in the family Caryophyllaceae. It is endemic to Ecuador. Its natural habitat is subtropical or tropical high-altitude grassland.

References

recurvata
Endemic flora of Ecuador
Least concern plants
Taxonomy articles created by Polbot